New Albany is an unincorporated community in Mahoning County, in the U.S. state of Ohio.

History
A post office called New Albany was established in 1842, and remained in operation until 1881. Besides the post office, New Albany had a steam mill, the first in Mahoning County.

References

Unincorporated communities in Mahoning County, Ohio
1842 establishments in Ohio
Populated places established in 1842
Unincorporated communities in Ohio